"Dance with Me (Just One More Time)" is a single by American country music artist Johnny Rodriguez. Released in June 1974, it was the second single from his album My Third Album. The song peaked at number 2 on the Billboard Hot Country Singles chart. It also reached number 1 on the RPM Country Tracks chart in Canada.

Chart performance

References

1974 singles
Johnny Rodriguez songs
Mercury Records singles
1974 songs
Songs written by Johnny Rodriguez